Deloit may refer to:

Deloit, Iowa, a city in Crawford County
Deloit, Nebraska, an unincorporated community in Holt County
Deloit Township, Holt County, Nebraska

See also 
 Deloitte, a professional services company